Ramu III (known as "Ramu," and later renamed "Winston") was an Orca  ("killer whale") who resided at the now-defunct Windsor Safari Park in Berkshire, England between 1970 and 1976, and later, at SeaWorld San Diego in California between 1976 and 1986.  An adult male, Ramu (actually Ramu III) was caught on August 8, 1970, after his pod of eighty orcas was 'corralled' during the Penn Cove capture in Penn Cove, near Coupeville, Washington, United States (six others were also caught, while four died and the remaining 69 escaped).  At capture, Ramu was 13.32 ft (4.06 m) long and a member of the Southern Resident Killer Whales' L-pod. It is assumed his family members still survive in the Salish Sea and in nearby Pacific coastal waters.

Windsor Safari Park
Ramu was then transferred to Windsor Safari Park, where he became the star attraction in the park's Sea World exhibition, (not to be confused with the American SeaWorld, where he would later move) splashing people with the beating of his tail against the water, along with a small number of dolphins, with whom Ramu cohabited.  Over the next six years, Ramu matured into a bull Orca and began to outgrow the relatively small tank at the safari park.  In October 1976, Ramu was sold to SeaWorld San Diego in a swap that saw two female Orcas (named Winnie and Hoi Wai) move in the other direction. To avoid confusion with another Orca named Ramu that already lived at Seaworld San Diego, Ramu was renamed Winston, although he inevitably performed under the stage name Shamu, (used for most performing whales at SeaWorld, after the first whale kept there.)

SeaWorld San Diego
As a fully grown male, Winston dwarfed even his pool mates, his size distinguishing him almost as much as his dorsal fin, which flopped over to his left hand side and made him instantly recognizable to visitors to the park. He courted and mated with several females at the park, impregnating Kandu V, Kenau and Katina.  Katina was the first to give birth, on September 26, 1985, to a healthy young female Orca named Kalina (the first of the 'Baby Shamu' generation of whale calves).  In January 1986, both Kenau and Kandu V lost their babies, Kenau's dying of a heart defect 11 days after birth and Kandu's being stillborn.

Kalina was the first calf conceived and born in captivity successfully, and the success ushered in a generation of numerous Orca births in captivity around the world. Kalina's mother Katina is still alive at SeaWorld Orlando in Florida, along with Kalina's own calves, Keet, (the first 'grandbaby' Shamu), Keto, Tuar and Skyla, as well as a stillbirth in 1997. In 2004, Keet had his first offspring, a female called Kalina, the first great grandbaby Shamu, making Winston a great-grandfather. In 2005, Keet sired Halyn, his second offspring thus making Winston a great-grandfather again. Kalina died on October 4, 2010, from sepsis, at 25 years old.

Winston's necropsy report dates his death to April 28, 1986, due to chronic cardiovascular failure. At the time of his last health checkup, Winston had been 7.4 metres long and weighed 5,443 kg.  He was approximately 23 years old at the time of his death.

Family members/breed
Daughters: Kalina*, Baby Shamu II*, and 1986 stillborn calf with Kandu V*
Granddaughters: Skyla*
Grandsons: Keet, Keto, and Tuar
Great-Granddaughters: Kalia and Halyn*
Possible relatives: Lil Nooka*, Jumbo*, Chappy*, Clovis*, and Ramu IV*
Breed: 100% Southern Resident

(Asterisk indicates a deceased relative)

See also
Shamu (SeaWorld show)
SeaWorld
Keiko, star of the Free Willy trilogy of films.
Windsor Safari Park
Captive orcas
List of captive orcas
List of individual cetaceans

References

External links
Official homepage of Sea World

1986 animal deaths
Individual orcas
Southern resident orcas